Christa Gietl (born 16 May 1977) is an Italian luger who has competed since 1994. A natural track luger, she won the silver medal in the women's singles event at the 1998 FIL World Luge Natural Track Championships in Rautavaara, Finland.

Gietl has found better success at the FIL European Luge Natural Track Championships, winning a complete set of medals in the women's singles event (Gold: 2006, Silver: 2004, Bronze: 1999).

References
FIL-Luge profile

Natural track World Championships results: 1979-2007

External links 
 

1977 births
Living people
Italian female lugers
Italian lugers
People from Feldthurns
Sportspeople from Südtirol